KFPT (790 AM) is an American radio station broadcasting a sports format. Licensed to Clovis, California, United States, the station serves the Fresno area.  790 ESPN Radio airs live sports from Fresno Pacific University and local ag reports. KFPT-AM is also Fresno's home for professional sports like The Raiders, 49ers, Giants, A's, Sharks & Lakers. The station is currently owned by Fat Dawgs 7 Broadcasting, LLC and features programming from  ESPN Radio.

History

The station went on the air as KXQR on 790 kHz in 1979, six years after receiving its construction permit, which in turn was 15 years after the group had first filed for the frequency in 1958. Several ownership changes occurred in the years between receiving the permit and signing on. Beginning in 1985, the station aired beautiful music with the call sign KXTC. The call letters were meant to imply "Ecstasy". The station changed its call sign to KOQO on September 28, 1988.

Expanded Band assignment

On March 17, 1997, the Federal Communications Commission (FCC) announced that eighty-eight stations had been given permission to move to newly available "Expanded Band" transmitting frequencies, ranging from 1610 to 1700 kHz, with KOQO authorized to move from 790 to 1630 kHz. A Construction Permit for the expanded band station was assigned the call letters KBEG on May 15, 1998, which were changed to KNAX on February 1, 1999, and to KOME on March 20, 2001. However the expanded band station was never built, and its Construction Permit was cancelled on January 15, 2004.

Later history

The station became Spanish-language KOOR in 1998. In July 2005, the call letters were changed to KFPT by CBS Broadcasting, standing for "Fresno's Progressive Talk"; during this time, KFPT became the market's second-most listened-to AM station.

In February 2007, KFPT AM 790 was purchased by Peak Broadcasting from CBS as part of a deal involving other stations including News/Talk KMJ, AM 580. It was then sold to Fat Dawgs 7 Broadcasting. The sale included a non-compete clause to protect Peak's conservative talk station, KMJ. On April 2, 2007, KFPT changed their format from progressive talk to sports, with programming from ESPN Radio.

References

External links
FCC History Cards for KFPT (covering 1958-1980 as KGPD / KXQR )

FPT
ESPN Radio stations
Clovis, California
Radio stations established in 1979